"Crazy" is a song written by Willie Nelson and popularized by country singer Patsy Cline in 1961. Nelson wrote the song while living in Houston, working for Pappy Daily's label D Records. He was also a radio DJ and performed in clubs. Nelson then moved to Nashville, Tennessee, working as a writer for  Pamper Music. Through Hank Cochran, the song reached Patsy Cline. After her original recording and release, Cline's version reached number two on Billboard's Hot Country Singles, also crossing to the pop chart as a top 10 single.

Cline's version is considered a country music standard and, in 1996, became the all-time most played song in jukeboxes in the United States. "Crazy" was covered by many artists; different versions reached the charts in a variety of genres. The song was featured in television shows, while many publications have included it in their all-time best songs lists. The Library of Congress inducted Cline's version into the National Recording Registry in 2003.

Background and writing
In 1958, while performing around Fort Worth, Texas and working as a DJ hosting The Western Express, Willie Nelson attracted the attention of Pappy Daily. Daily, a record producer from Houston, offered Nelson a recording contract with D Records as well as a job as a writer for Glad Music. Nelson moved to Houston, where he also searched for musical gigs in ballrooms and clubs. At the Esquire Ballroom, band leader Larry Butler told Nelson that he could not offer a musician job. In response, Nelson suggested he sell original songs that he played for Butler on a reel-to-reel tape recorder. Butler liked the songs, but refused to buy, instead offering Nelson a job working six nights a week with his band. Nelson and his family settled in Pasadena, Texas, where he became a DJ on radio station KRCT. Later, he also taught guitar.

Nelson used his commute from Pasadena to the Esquire Ballroom as writing time, because the  ride usually took an hour that he used to develop new lyrics. Over one week, he wrote "Crazy", "Night Life", and "Funny How Time Slips Away". At the time, Nelson's mood was negatively affected by his lack of stable employment while supporting his wife and three children, since his three jobs did not provide enough income. On his long night commutes to clubs, he compared his situation with those of his contemporaries and felt that "the world was asleep". According to his autobiography It's A Long Story: My Life, Nelson wondered if he were "Crazy" and completed the song as if he were a man whose relationship recently ended. Musician Sleepy LaBeef, who accompanied Nelson on upright bass on the song's demo recording, asserted that the songwriter had arrived in Houston with "Crazy" already written. Additionally, biographer Joe Nick Patoski noted that Nelson played "Crazy" for Butler along with the songs he planned to sell just as he arrived in the city. Nelson wrote "Crazy" in less than an hour, and originally titled it "Stupid". The intonation of the opening was inspired by Floyd Tillman's "I Gotta Have My Baby Back".

Nelson sold an original song, "Family Bible", which was then recorded by Claude Gray, whose version enjoyed success. But Nelson's employment situation remained unstable. He accumulated debt, while he often attended parties and drank to excess. In July 1960, Nelson was arrested for speeding and driving without a license. After several tardy incidents, he was fired by KRCT, then let go from a Pasadena club where he performed. Nelson then decided to move his wife and children to Waco, Texas, and, after the success of "Family Bible", moved to Nashville, Tennessee .

At first Nelson lived with Billy Walker, who found him an encyclopedia sales job. Walker also took him to different music publishers in town, and introduced Nelson as the writer of "Family Bible" to the artists and songwriters that frequented Tootsie's Orchid Lounge. Through steel guitarist Buddy Emmons, Nelson became acquainted with many Grand Ole Opry performers. The publishing house Pamper Music hired him after Faron Young's recording of "Hello Walls" and Billy Walker's of "Funny How Time Slips Away" succeeded.

Patsy Cline's recording

In his book, Willie: An Autobiography, Nelson recalled that it was hard to find artists interested in recording "Crazy" due to its use of several chords, instead of the standard three used for country music compositions at the time. Walker intended to record the song, and made a demo at Starday Records. Ultimately, the label decided to reject Walker's proposition since they felt that "Crazy" would not have commercial success.

Nelson's fellow Pamper Music song plugger and writer Hank Cochran played "Crazy" for Patsy Cline's producer Owen Bradley, who felt that the composition would be good for Cline. Cochran then told Walker about Bradley's interest in the song for Cline and asked him not to record it. In exchange, Cochran gave Walker "Charlie's Shoes".

Cline's husband Charlie Dick had previously taken her a demo of Nelson's "Night Life". Cline disliked the song, and she asked her husband not bring her any more of Nelson's songs, saying that she did not want to record compositions that embraced vulnerability or loss of love. The persistent Cochran drove Nelson to Cline's house with the demo of "Crazy". While Nelson waited in the car, Cochran played the song for Cline. Cline told Cochran to bring Nelson into the house, where he taught her to sing the song. Cline had difficulty following Nelson's phrasing because he sang behind the beat. An alternative account published by Nelson in his 2015 book It's A Long Story: My Life revealed that, while drinking with Dick at Tootsie's Orchid Lounge, Nelson played his demo of "Crazy" on the bar's jukebox. Dick thought the song was good, that his wife should record it, and offered to take Nelson to his home to play the demo for Cline. Because it was after midnight, Nelson decided to wait in the car as Dick played the song for Cline, and she later invited him in.

Bradley planned to record "Crazy" with the minor and major sevenths jazz chords favored by Nelson. For most of the song, the composition uses a B-flat key but ends in B major. Bradley decided to add the Jordanaires on background vocals,  pianist Floyd Cramer, and bass guitarist Bob Moore. Floyd opened with a four-bar introduction, followed by brushing from drummer Buddy Harman. Moore was complemented by Harold Bradley's electric guitar, creating a tic-tac effect. The first four-hour recording session took place on August 21, 1961, at Quonset Hut Studio. Cline had recently been in a car accident that bruised her ribs and Owen Bradley had to end her participation because, in her pain, she could not reach the notes needed to match Nelson's phrasing. Bradley worked the arrangements with the musicians and recorded the music track for the song.

Bradley asked Cline to use her own rather than Nelson's singing style. After her ribs recovered three weeks later, Cline returned to record her vocal track; she accomplished it on the first take. During the session on September 15, 1961,  Cline's vocal featured ascending and descending intervals and the use of broken chords. Cline learned to sing in the style needed for "Crazy" early in her life; she listened to and imitated big band and jazz performers that she heard on the radio. Following Nelson, Cline sang slightly behind the beat, but modified to fit her own unique style.

Release and reception

"Crazy" was released in October 1961 by Decca Records under catalog number 31317 with "Who Can I Count On" on the flip side.  In November, "Crazy" was included on Cline's album Showcase. After 11 weeks, the single peaked at number two on Billboard's Hot Country Singles and it crossed over to the pop charts reaching number 9 on the Billboard Hot 100, also attaining number two on Billboard's Easy Listening chart. With the success of  "Crazy" and her previous single "I Fall to Pieces", Cline was named Billboard's Favorite Female Country Artist of 1961. In November 1961, Cline sang "Crazy" during a performance with the Grand Ole Opry cast at Carnegie Hall.

"Crazy" became Cline's most successful pop single, her signature song, and one of the country songs that generated the most royalties. Nelson dubbed Cline's his favorite version of his composition.  He opined that her interpretation was done with "delicacy, soul, and perfect diction". Media outlets, including National Public Radio, New Musical Express, and American Songwriter defined "Crazy" as a country music standard.

The recording was featured in the 1985 Cline biopic Sweet Dreams. In 1989, the Amusement and Music Operators Association ranked "Crazy" number two on the all-time Top 40 Jukebox Singles on the United States list.  By 1996, the updated list cited the song as the most played in jukeboxes. "Crazy" appeared on the UK Singles Chart in 1987 at number 79, and moved to number 14 in 1990. The next year, it peaked at number 14 on the Irish Singles Chart. In 2003, Cline's recording was inducted into the National Recording Registry by the Library of Congress. The next year, it was ranked number 85 on Rolling Stones list of 500 Greatest Songs of All Time. In the 2021 version of the list, the magazine placed it at number 195. In 2018, it was included by New Musical Express on their "25 best country songs of all time" list, in 2019; The Tennessean listed it as one of the 100 best country songs of all time.

Personnel
All credits are adapted from the original liner notes of Showcase.
Harold Bradley – 6-string electric bass
Owen Bradley – organ
Floyd Cramer – piano
Buddy Harman – drums
Walter Haynes – steel guitar
Randy Hughes – acoustic guitar
The Jordanaires – backing vocals
Grady Martin – electric guitar
Bob Moore – acoustic bass

Other versions
Nelson recorded his own version of "Crazy" for his 1962 debut album, ...And Then I Wrote.  Nelson's original demo of "Crazy" was released on 2003's Crazy: The Demo Sessions. In 1977, Linda Ronstadt released a version as a single from her album Hasten Down the Wind. Ronstadt's release reached number six on Billboard's Hot Country Songs chart. A version by Beverly D'Angelo was featured on the 1980 film Coal Miner's Daughter.

In 1993, Canadian country music singer Colleen Peterson charted with her version of "Crazy" at number 29 on the RPM country music chart. Julio Iglesias' single release of the song appeared at number 43 on the UK Singles Chart in 1994. In 1998, a cover of "Crazy" by Kidneythieves was featured on the soundtrack of Bride of Chucky. American singer LeAnn Rimes included "Crazy" on her 1999 album LeAnn Rimes. It reached number 36 on the UK Singles Chart.

"Crazy" was twice featured in the TV series Nashville: sung by Juliette Barnes in the 2014 episode "That's Me Without You", and by Barnes and Steven Tyler in a duet on the 2015 episode "Can't Let Go".  Nelson recorded duets of the song with Mary Sarah (2014) and then with Carla Bruni (2017). In 2022, Heather Small performed a version of "Crazy" in series 3 of the British version of The Masked Singer.

Charts and certifications

Patsy Cline

|+Certifications of Patsy Cline's "Crazy"

Other artists

References

Sources

External links
SecondHandSongs listing of known covers of "Crazy"
Library of Congress essay on Patsy Cline's version and its inclusion in the National Recording Registry.
 

1960s ballads
1961 singles
1961 songs
Country ballads
Curb Records singles
Decca Records singles
Dottie West songs
Grammy Hall of Fame Award recipients
Julio Iglesias songs
LeAnn Rimes songs
Linda Ronstadt songs
Music videos directed by John Lloyd Miller
Patsy Cline songs
Pop ballads
Ray Price (musician) songs
Renée Geyer songs
Song recordings produced by Owen Bradley
Songs written by Willie Nelson
Songs about loneliness
Songs about heartache
United States National Recording Registry recordings
Willie Nelson songs